Isopodichnus is an ichnogenus of trace fossil. Ribbon-like in form, Isopodichnus traces were likely formed by the activity of an isopod crustacean foraging within the preserved sediment. Parallel to the bedding plane, a central furrow is flanked by two hypichnial ridges. Trails may also exhibit scratch marks and be associated with Rusophycus-like resting traces. Isopodichnus are very similar in form to Cruziana traces, making delineation of the two forms difficult, and controversial.

See also
 Cruziana
 Ichnology
 Trace fossil

References

External links
 Chuck D. Howell's Ichnogenera Photos

Further reading
 Mikuláš R. (1992): Trace fossils from the Kosov Formation of the Bohemian Upper Ordovician, Sbor. geol. Věd, Paleont., 32, 9-54

Arthropod trace fossils